Casanova Variations is a 2014 French-Austrian-German fantasy historical drama film written and directed by Michael Sturminger and starring John Malkovich.  It is based on Histoire de ma vie by Giacomo Casanova, who is played by Malkovich.

Plot

Cast
 John Malkovich as Giacomo Casanova
 Veronica Ferres as Elisa
 Florian Boesch as Giacomo II
 Miah Persson as Elisa II
 Lola Naymark as Cecile
 Kerstin Avemo as Leonilda
 Tracy-Ann Oberman as Jessica
 Maria João Bastos as Lady Doctor
 Kate Lindsey as Belline
 Anna Prohaska as Caterina
 Barbara Hannigan as Sofia
 Topi Lehtipuu as Duke
 Fanny Ardant as Lucrecia
 Jonas Kaufmann as Count Branicki

References

External links
 
 

2010s Italian-language films
French historical fantasy films
Austrian historical films
German historical fantasy films
French biographical drama films
German biographical drama films
Austrian biographical drama films
Cultural depictions of Giacomo Casanova
Films about Giacomo Casanova
English-language French films
English-language German films
2014 biographical drama films
2010s historical fantasy films
2014 drama films
2010s English-language films
2010s French films
2010s German films